Maselino Tuifao is a Samoan Olympic boxer. He represented his country in the welterweight division at the 1992 Summer Olympics. He had a bye the first round, and then lost his first bout to Michael Carruth.

References

1970 births
Living people
Samoan male boxers
Olympic boxers of Samoa
Boxers at the 1992 Summer Olympics
Welterweight boxers